Niklas Kiel (born 4 September 1997) is a German former professional basketball player for the Skyliners Frankfurt of the German League Basketball Bundesliga.  He retired in September 2020 at the age of 22. Because of three concussions, Kiel was unable to continue his professional career.

References

External links
Real GM Profile
German Basketball Federation Profile
Eurobasket.com Profile

1997 births
Living people
German men's basketball players
Forwards (basketball)
Skyliners Frankfurt players
People from Herford
Sportspeople from Detmold (region)